Daniel Jamatia is an Indian politician and member of the Communist Party of India (Marxist). Jamatia was served as a member of the Tripura Legislative Assemblyin the year 2008 to 2018 from the Ampinagar constituency in South Tripura district. In 2018 Tripura Legislative Assembly election Daniel was defeated by Indigenous Peoples Front of Tripura candidate Sindhu Chandra Jamatia.

Political career
He started his political career with the membership of Tribal Youth Federation. In 1994, he became a member of Communist Party of India (Marxist) and in 1995 he was nominated as A.D.C village chairman. At present day he served as a central committee member of Ganamukti Parishad.

See also
 Radhacharan Debbarma
 Aghore Debbarma
 Pravat Chowdhury

References

Communist Party of India (Marxist) politicians
Communist Party of India (Marxist) politicians from Tripura
Tripura politicians

Living people
1963 births
Tripuri people
People from Tripura
Tripura MLAs 2008–2013
Tripura MLAs 2013–2018